Seyyed Shahabedin Hosseini Tonekaboni (born February 3, 1974) is an Iranian actor, producer and director. He is known for his collaborations with Iranian Academy Award-winning director Asghar Farhadi in About Elly (2009), A Separation (2011), and The Salesman (2016). His accolades include a Cannes Film Festival Award for Best Actor, a Silver Bear for Best Actor and a Crystal Simorgh for Best Actor.

Early life
Shahab Hosseini was born on February, 3rd, 1974 in Tehran. He earned his high school diploma in Biology. He dropped out of the University of Tehran  as a psychology student and emigrated to Canada. Later, he became a radio host in Iran, and hosted a TV show for youth. He also took on some small acting roles in a few TV series. Hosseini's cinematic debut was in Rokhsareh (2002) directed by Amir Ghavidel. His career took off with his performance in the movie The Fifth Reaction directed by Tahmineh Milani. In June 2011, he announced that he would be taking a break but would return to cinema in 2013. He also received a lot of attention in Young Police.

Career

Acting
Hosseini has won the Silver Bear for Best Actor for A Separation at the 61st Berlin International Film Festival, and the Best Actor Award in the 2016 Cannes Film Festival for his role in The Salesman. Hosseini won his first award, Crystal Simorgh for Superstar in 2009. In 2013, he made his directorial debut. In 2020, Hosseini co-founded Pol Media ("pol" translating to "bridge" in Persian) with director Kourosh Ahari and producer Alex Bretow, a distribution and production company aiming to "bridge the gap" between Iranian art, culture and cinema with that of the U.S. He is coming up with the first-ever Turkish-Iranian film, Drunk on Love. He will be in the lead role alongside Hande Erçel, Parsa Pirouzfar, İbrahim Çelikkol, Selma Ergeç, Bensu Soral and Boran Kuzum.

Filmography

Film

Web

Television

Awards and nominations

References

External links

Yahoo.com Iranian Star Shahab Hosseini Wins Best Actor Award at Cannes

1974 births
Living people
Iranian male film actors
Iranian film directors
20th-century Iranian male actors
21st-century Iranian male actors
Cannes Film Festival Award for Best Actor winners
Silver Bear for Best Actor winners
People from Tonekabon
Male actors from Tehran
Iranian radio and television presenters
Iranian television talk show hosts
Crystal Simorgh for Best Actor winners